Mohammad Yousuf (known before his conversion to Islam as Yousuf Youhana) is a Pakistan cricketer and former captain of the Pakistan national cricket team.  He has scored centuries (100 or more runs) on 24 occasions in Test cricket and 15 times in One Day International (ODI) matches. , he has the second-highest number of centuries in international cricket for Pakistan. Described by one writer in 2010 as one of the best middle order batsmen ever, and by the West Indies cricketer Brian Lara in 2006 as "not just a role model for Pakistan cricket but for young cricketers around the world", Yousuf captained the Pakistan side in nine Tests and eight ODIs between 2003 and 2010. , he holds the world record for the most runs in Test matches during a calendar year, scoring 1,788 runs in 11 Tests during 2006. He scored nine international centuries in 2006, also a world record for a calendar year. In 2007, when he was named as one of the Wisden Cricketers of the Year, the cricket almanack Wisden noted his "stylishness" as well as his "appetite for runs".

Yousuf made his Test debut against South Africa in 1998. Later the same year, he reached his first Test century against Zimbabwe at the Gaddafi Stadium, Lahore, scoring 120 not out. His highest Test score of 223 came in a match against England at the same venue, during the 2005–06 series between the teams. He has made a double century (200 or more runs) on four occasions during Tests. Yousuf has scored Test centuries at 16 cricket grounds, including 12 at venues outside Pakistan. He is third in the list of Test century-makers for Pakistan behind Younis Khan (33) and Inzamam-ul-Haq (25).

Having made his ODI debut in 1998 against Zimbabwe at Harare Sports Club, Yousuf's first century came against Australia in November 1998. His highest ODI score is 141 not out against Zimbabwe at Queens Sports Club, Bulawayo, in 2002. He is second in the list of leading century-makers in ODIs for Pakistan behind Saeed Anwar, and has scored centuries against eight countries. Yousuf has made seven ODI centuries at home grounds and eight at other venues.

He has played three Twenty20 International (T20I) matches, all against England between 2006 and 2010; he did not score a century in any of the games. , he is joint nineteenth in the list of century-makers in international cricket, all formats of the game combined.

Key

Test cricket centuries

ODI cricket centuries

Notes and references 
Notes

References

External links 
 

Yousuf
Yousuf, Mohammad